Annikvere is a village in Haljala Parish, Lääne-Viru County, in northeastern Estonia.

Annikvere Manor (Annigfer) was first mentioned in 1445.

References
 

Villages in Lääne-Viru County